Iowa Highway 81 is a state highway that runs from south to north in southeastern Iowa.  It begins at the Missouri state line southwest of Farmington, where it continues as Missouri Route 81 and ends at Iowa 2 in Farmington.  The route Iowa 81 takes has been in the primary highway system since the 1920s.  The current Iowa 81 was created on January 1, 1969, when it traded route numbers with Iowa 114 in the southeast-central part of the state.

Route description
Iowa 81 begins at the Missouri border, where it is a continuation of Missouri Route 81.  The highway heads in a northeasterly direction from that point, passing by Indian Lake Park along the way. It ends at Iowa 2 on the west side of Farmington.

History
Prior to its current designation, Iowa 81 was known as Iowa 114.  On January 1, 1969, Iowa 114 and Iowa 81 traded route numbers in order to harmonize route numbers with neighboring states, Route 81 in Missouri, in this case.  At the time of its designation, the highway was a fully paved road.

Major intersections

References

External links

End of Iowa 81 at Iowa Highway Ends

081